Eloy de la Iglesia (1 January 1944 – 23 March 2006) was a Spanish screenwriter and  film director.

De la Iglesia was an outspoken gay socialist filmmaker who is relatively unknown outside Spain despite a prolific and successful career in his native country. He is best remembered for having portrayed urban marginality and the world of drugs and juvenile delinquency, with many of his films dealing with the theme of homosexuality. Part of his work is closely related to the phenomenon popularly known in Spain as quinqui films, to which he contributed several works. De la Iglesia took risk in his films that captured the struggles of the underclass, portraying the everyday, unidealized lives of powerless characters portrayed genuinely with flaws and vices. They are an example of commitment to the immediate reality, going against the conformist outlook of most movies of its time. Beyond their debatable aesthetic merits, his film served a document of the Spanish marginality of the late seventies and early eighties, and they have the stamp of his strong personality. Many of this films also deal with the theme of homosexuality.

Early life and films
Born in Zarauz, Guipúzcoa into a wealthy Basque family, he grew up in Madrid. His desire to follow a career in filmmaking was initially thwarted. He attended courses at the prestigious Parisian Institut des hautes études cinématographiques, but he could not enter Spain's national Film School because he wasn't yet 21, the minimum age required for admission. Instead, he began to study philosophy and literature at the Complutense University of Madrid, but on his third curse he abandoned it to direct children's theater. By age twenty he had already written and directed many works for television sharpening his narrative skills. He established himself as a writer of children's television programs for Radiotelevisíon Española in Barcelona.

De la Iglesia made his debut as film director when he was only twenty-two years old with Fantasia 3 (Fantasy 3 ) (1966), adapting three children's stories: The Maid of the Sea, The three hairs from the devil and The Wizard of Oz. While doing mandatory military service, he wrote the script of his second film, Algo Amargo en la Boca (Something Bitter Tasting) (1968).  Algo Amargo en la boca, a sordid melodrama, and de la Iglesia's next film, Cuadrilatero (Boxing Ring) (1969), a boxing story, faced problems with the Francoist censors and  failed at the box office. His films did not attract widespread notice until his fourth effort, the critically acclaimed thriller El Techo de Cristal (The Glass Ceiling) (1970).

During the early 1970s, de la Iglesia was a member of the Spanish Communist Party; his films of this period reflected his beliefs and often centered on violent forms of social protest. His political leanings and the lurid subjects of his film made him a controversial filmmaker facing many problems with the Spanish censor under Francisco Franco's régime.

He approached the horror genre in his two following films: La semana del asesino (The Cannibal Man) (1971) and  Nadie oyó gritar  (No One Heard the Scream) (1972), leaving stylistic and structural academicism aside. He defined a sharp style, torn and impressionistic. His subsequent film  Una gota de sangre para seguir amando (Murder in a Blue World) (1973), written with José Luis Garci, a mixed of futuristic thriller, took some cues from Stanley Kubrick's A Clockwork Orange.

Films of the transition 

The dismantling of the Francoist censorship allowed Eloy de la Iglesia to increase sexually charged tones in his works.<ref name = "Torres 251">Torres,  Diccionario Espasa Cine Español,  p. 251</ref>  This approach became apparent in his films: Juego de amor prohibido  (Games of Forbbiden Love) (1975) and La otra alcoba (The other bedroom) (1976).

In the late 1970s Eloy de la Iglesia, associated with journalist and screen writer Gonzalo Goicoechea, tackled former taboo subjects in Spanish Cinema. Los placeres ocultos  (Hidden Pleasures ) (1977) focused on homosexuality. El diputado (Confessions  of a Congressman) (1979), follows the story of a politician who is blackmailed due to his secret homosexuality and El sacerdote (The Priest ), also released in 1979, deals with a conservative catholic priest whose sexual obsessions leads him to self-mutilation.

With the arrival of the 1980s, de La Iglesia explored the theme of urban insecurity in his film Miedo a salir de noche  (Fear to go out at Night) (1980) and he mixed sex, politics and violence in La mujer del ministro (The Minister's wife) (1981).	
		
De la Iglesia's subsequent films, written in collaboration with Gonzalo Goicoechea, were centered in social problems such as juvenile delinquency and drug addiction in films like: Navajeros (Knifers) (1980), Colegas (Pals) (1982), El pico (The Needle) (1983) and El pico 2 (The Needle 2) (1984). These films made an effort to connect with a popular audience in a direct and unpretentious style. His formula for success involved young non-professional actors, topical themes, a modest budget, and usually on location shooting. In the period between the last years of the 1970s and the early 1980s de la Iglesia was one of  Spain's most commercial successful film directors, by contrast film critics were usually harsh in the appreciation of his work. El pico  became the director's biggest success at the box office.

After the critical and commercial failure of Otra vuelta de tuerca (The Turn of the Screw) (1985), loosely based on Henry James's eponymous novel, de la Iglesia returned to the subject of juvenile delinquency in La Estanquera de vallecas (The Tobacconist from Vallecas) (1987), this time employing a humorous tone. La Estanquera de vallecas, based on an eponymous play by José Luis Alonso de Santos, continued de la Iglesia's commercial success, but it was not well received by Spanish critics.

Last years
Like many of the young protagonists of his films, Eloy de la iglesia became addicted to drugs such as heroin and he stopped making films for fifteen years. Claiming that his addiction to cinema was stronger than his drug problems, de la Iglesia eventually kicked his habit and resumed his career making Los novios bulgaros (The Bulgarian Lovers) (2003), a film based on the novel of the same title written by Eduardo Mendicutti.

Stricken with kidney cancer, he died on 23 March 2006, aged sixty two, after surgery to remove a malignant tumor.

Filmography as director

Notes

References
D’Lugo, Marvin.  Guide to the Cinema of Spain. Greenwood Press, 1997. 
Mira, Alberto. Historical Dictionary of Spanish Cinema. Scarecrow press, 2010. 
Murray, Raymond. Images in the Dark: An Encyclopedia of Gay and Lesbian Film and Video Guide to the Cinema of Spain. TLA Publications, 1994, 
Torres, Augusto. Diccionario del cine Español'', Espasa Calpe, 1994,

External links
 

Film directors from the Basque Country (autonomous community)
Spanish male screenwriters
Spanish LGBT screenwriters
LGBT film directors
Gay screenwriters
1944 births
2006 deaths
Spanish gay writers
20th-century Spanish screenwriters
20th-century Spanish male writers
People from Zarautz
20th-century Spanish LGBT people
Deaths from cancer in Spain
Deaths from kidney cancer